Denmark has competed in the Junior Eurovision Song Contest three times. Danish broadcaster DR hosted the first Junior Eurovision Song Contest in 2003, having developed the contest's predecessor MGP Nordic.

History
In spring 2000, Danmarks Radio launched a song contest for aspiring singers aged 8 to 15, for which the format proved to be a success and caught the attention of Norway and Sweden two years later, making a pre-Scandinavian song contest known as MGP Nordic, first held in 2002. The EBU later picked up on the idea of said format and created a pan-European version, known as the Junior Eurovision Song Contest.

Having come in the top five in the first three contests, DR decided not to participate in the contest from  onwards to continue with MGP Nordic alongside 's SVT and 's NRK. In 2007, DR revealed that they had no intention to return to the contest, choosing to stick with the MGP Nordic competition.

The European Broadcasting Union (EBU) had previously been negotiating with commercial broadcasters to replace the Nordic broadcasters at Junior Eurovision. TV 2 has however ruled out Junior Eurovision participation.

On 17 February 2018, it was reported that the EBU is calling on Danish broadcaster Denmark's Radio (DR) to return to Junior Eurovision after a 12-year break. DR continues to hold MGP Junior without sending the winner to other contests.

Participation overview

Commentators and spokespersons

The contests are broadcast online worldwide through the official Junior Eurovision Song Contest website junioreurovision.tv and YouTube. In 2015, the online broadcasts featured commentary in English by junioreurovision.tv editor Luke Fisher and 2011 Bulgarian Junior Eurovision Song Contest entrant Ivan Ivanov. The Danish broadcaster, DR, sent their own commentators to each contest in order to provide commentary in the Danish language. Spokespersons were also chosen by the national broadcaster in order to announce the awarding points from Denmark. The table below list the details of each commentator and spokesperson since 2003.

Hostings

See also 
Denmark in the Eurovision Dance Contest – Dance version of the Eurovision Song Contest.
Denmark in the Eurovision Song Contest – Senior version of the Junior Eurovision Song Contest.
Denmark in the Eurovision Young Dancers – A competition organised by the EBU for younger dancers aged between 16 and 21.
Denmark in the Eurovision Young Musicians – A competition organised by the EBU for musicians aged 18 years and younger.

References

Countries in the Junior Eurovision Song Contest
Junior Eurovision Song Contest